Scott Drevitch (born in Brookline, Massachusetts on 9 September 1965) is an American retired ice hockey and roller hockey defenseman.

Ice hockey
Following a collegiate career with the University of Maine Black Bears and the University of Lowell Riverhawks, Drevitch failed to go pro as a free agent Drevitch was assigned to the Boston Bruins' East Coast Hockey League affiliate Maine Mariners.  He played a full season for the Mariners, showing the offensive flair he would enjoy throughout his playing days, but concerns about size in an era where smaller, more mobile defensemen were not the norm, had him sent down the following season.

Drevitch spent most of 18 seasons in the mid- to low-minor leagues. He spent five seasons with the Tacoma Sabercats of the West Coast Hockey League, and was the career leader in games played, assists and scoring for the franchise; he also played three seasons for the Adirondack Frostbite of the United Hockey League, as well as playing for a number of teams in the ECHL, the IHL, UHL, ECHL, and WCHL, but never the NHL.  He also played in Sweden, Austria, and the Netherlands.

Drevitch's excellent conditioning allowed him to continue playing hockey into his 40's. His advanced age allowed rookie teammate Mark Hurtubise, from the 2005-06 Adirondack Frostbite's, to draw attention to the fact that Drevitch was as old has his father.

His final season was in 2007 with the Elmira Jackals of the UHL; at the time of his retirement, he was the final player for the Albany Choppers, New Haven Nighthawks and Maine Mariners franchises active in pro hockey.

Roller hockey
Drevitch played five seasons of major league inline hockey with Roller Hockey International playing with the Atlanta Fire Ants (1994), Oklahoma Coyotes (1995 and 1996), Los Angeles Blades (1997) and San Jose Rhinos (1999).

Drevitch currently runs a series of hockey camps in upstate New York and Cape Cod, is a coach for the Bridgewater Bandits Tier II organization in the Eastern Junior Hockey League, and now after failing to go pro, he coached the Division 3 Middleboro Sachems high school hockey team before eventually losing that position as well .

Career statistics

See also
List of select Jewish ice hockey players

References

External links 
 
 Drevitch's Play Like a Pro hockey camp

American men's ice hockey defensemen
Adirondack Frostbite players
Adirondack IceHawks players
Albany Choppers players
Atlanta Fire Ants players
Borås HC players
Cleveland Barons (2001–2006) players
Dayton Bombers players
Elmira Jackals (UHL) players
Grand Rapids Griffins players
Huntington Blizzard players
Jacksonville Lizard Kings players
Jewish American sportspeople
Jewish ice hockey players
Los Angeles Blades players
Las Vegas Thunder players
UMass Lowell River Hawks men's ice hockey players
Maine Black Bears men's ice hockey players
Maine Mariners players
New Haven Nighthawks players
Oklahoma Coyotes players
Phoenix Roadrunners (IHL) players
Port Huron Beacons players
Richmond Renegades players
San Diego Gulls (IHL) players
San Jose Rhinos players
Tacoma Sabercats players
TYSC Trappers players
Virginia Lancers players
Innsbrucker EV players
Living people
1965 births
Sportspeople from Brookline, Massachusetts
Ice hockey players from Massachusetts
21st-century American Jews